The United States National Criterium Championships are held annually and run by the national governing body, USA Cycling.

The event has formerly been held at venues including Denver, Colorado, Downers Grove, Illinois, and Glencoe, Illinois. The 2015 edition of the race will be hosted by the city of Chattanooga, Tennessee. Formerly, the event allowed an international field, so the first rider from the United States who crossed the finish line was crowned the "United States National Criterium Champion" gaining the right to wear the national champion's jersey in subsequent criteriums for the following year. As domestic participation has grown in more recent years, the event has been limited to United States citizens so that the winner of the race will also be crowned the national champion.

Results

Men

Women

See also
 United States National Road Race Championships
 United States National Time Trial Championships

References

External links
 USA Cycling
 USA Cycling Pro Championships

National road cycling championships
Cycle races in the United States
Recurring sporting events established in 1980
1980 establishments in the United States